Jesus College, Oxford, one of the constituent colleges of the University of Oxford, is run by the principal and fellows of the college.  The principal of the college must be "a person distinguished for literary or scientific attainments, or for services in the work of education in the University or elsewhere". The principal has "pre-eminence and authority over all members of the College and all persons connected therewith" and exercises "a general superintendence in all matters relating to education and discipline". The current principal, Sir Nigel Shadbolt, was appointed in 2015 and is the thirty first holder of the office.  This figure does not include Seth Ward, who was elected principal by the fellows in 1657 but never installed: Oliver Cromwell, Chancellor of the university at the time, appointed Francis Howell instead. Fourteen Principals have been former students of the college, the first being Griffith Powell, elected in 1613, and the most recent being Alfred Hazel, elected in 1925.  The longest-serving Principal was Henry Foulkes, from 1817 to 1857.

When the college was founded in 1571 by Queen Elizabeth I, the first charter installed David Lewis as principal and named eight others as the first fellows. The statutes of 1622 allowed for 16 fellows. There is now no limit on the number of fellowships that the governing body can create. The college statutes provide for various categories of fellows. Professorial fellows are those professors and readers of the university who are allocated to the college by the university. One of these professorships is the Jesus Professor of Celtic, which is the only chair in Celtic studies at an English university. Holders of the position since its creation in 1877 include John Rhys, Ellis Evans and Thomas Charles-Edwards. The zoologists Charles Godfray and Paul Harvey are both professorial fellows. Official fellows are those who hold tutorial or administrative appointments in the college. Past official fellows include the composer and musicologist John Caldwell, the historians Sir Goronwy Edwards and Niall Ferguson, the philosopher Galen Strawson and the political philosopher John Gray. There are also senior and junior research fellows.  Principals and fellows who retire can be elected as emeritus fellows. The college can also elect "distinguished persons" to honorary fellowships.

A further category is that of Welsh supernumerary fellows, who are, in rotation, the Vice-Chancellors of Cardiff University, Swansea University, Lampeter University, Aberystwyth University, Bangor University and the University of Wales College of Medicine. There is one Welsh supernumerary fellow at a time, holding the position for not longer than three years. The first of these was John Viriamu Jones in 1897.

The college formerly had a category of missionary fellows, known as Leoline fellows after their founder, Principal Leoline Jenkins.  In his will in 1685, he stated that "It is but too obvious that the persons in Holy Orders employed in his Majesty's fleet at sea and foreign plantations are too few." To address this, he established two fellowships, whose holders should serve as clergy "in any of his Majesty's fleets or in his Majesty's plantations" under the direction of the Lord High Admiral and the Bishop of London respectively. The last of these, Frederic de Winton, was appointed in 1876 and held his fellowship until his death in 1932. This category was abolished in 1877 by the Oxford and Cambridge Universities Commission, without prejudice to the rights of existing holders such as de Winton. Another category of fellowship that was abolished in the 19th century was that of the King Charles I fellows, founded by Charles I in 1636 and tenable by natives of the Channel Islands in an attempt by him to "reclaim the Channel Islands from the extreme Calvinism which characterised them." The first such Fellow was Daniel Brevint.

Whilst the founding charter did not require the fellows or the students to be Welsh, the college has long had strong associations with Wales.  Between 1571 and 1915, only one principal (Francis Howell, 1657–1660) was not from Wales or of Welsh descent.  Many of the fellows in the past were also Welsh, since when new fellowships were created by benefactions (often by people of Welsh descent) there was frequently a stipulation that the recipients would be related to the donor or come from a place in Wales specified by the donor.  These specific limitations were removed as part of reforms of Oxford University during the 19th century.

List of principals
Key:
OM – An Old Member of the college who became a fellow, included in the list of alumni
HF – An honorary fellow of the college, included in the list of honorary fellows

Other notable fellows
Key:
OM – An Old Member of the college who became a Fellow, included in the list of alumni
HF – An Honorary Fellow of the college, included in the list of Honorary Fellows

References

Notes

Bibliography

The Jesus College Record – annual publication. Cited in references as: JCR

 Cited in references as: Foster, 1500–1714
 Cited in references as: Hardy
  Cited in references as: ODNB
 Cited in references as: Honours
 Cited in references as: DWB
  Cited in references as: Who's Who
  Cited in references as: Who Was Who

External links
The college website's list of academic staff

Principals
Principals
Lists of people associated with the University of Oxford
Lists of university and college leaders